Cyprus selected their Junior Eurovision Song Contest 2014 entry through an internal selection. On 21 July 2014 it was revealed that Sophia Patsalides would represent Cyprus in the contest with the song "I pio omorfi mera".

Internal selection
Despite withdrawing from the Eurovision Song Contest 2014, on 3 July 2014 it was announced that Cyprus would return to the Junior Eurovision Song Contest in 2014. On 21 July 2014, it was revealed that 13-year-old Sophia Patsalides would represent Cyprus with the song "I pio omorfi mera". The song was released on 23 September 2014.

At Junior Eurovision 
At the running order draw which took place on 9 November 2014, Cyprus were drawn to perform fifth on 15 November 2014, following  and preceding .

Voting

Detailed voting results
The following members comprised the Cypriot jury:
 Dora Constantinou
 Antonis Tofias
 Demetris Mouxtaroudis
 Chara Prokopiou
 Aggelos Aygousti

Notes

References

Junior Eurovision Song Contest
Cyprus
2014